Fairland is a residential suburb in northern  Johannesburg, Gauteng, South Africa. The area is neighboured by Northcliff, Cresta and Darrenwood and is one of the most leafy suburbs in the city. Fairland was developed on land that was originally a farm called Weltevreden.
Statistics indicate that Fairland has some of the lowest crime statistics within Johannesburg.

Facilities
Major shopping centres around Fairland include: Cresta Shopping Centre, Clearwater Shopping Centre, EL Corro Shopping Centre, Fairland Walk Shopping Centre, Trade Centre, Makro etc.

There are a number of schools in the area, namely Laerskool Fairland, and Cliffview Primary School.

Transportation
Johannesburg City Centre proximity (10 km) is within direct access to Beyers Naude drive.
The N1 highway passes Fairland on the North-Westerly side with two offramps. 14th Avenue/ N1 and newly upgraded spaghetti offramp Beyers Naude/ N1.

References

Johannesburg Region C